Mayank Sidhana (born 4 December 1986) is an Indian cricketer. He plays for Punjab in the Indian domestic cricket. He is a right-hand batsman and part-time offbreak bowler.

References

External links

1986 births
Living people
Indian cricketers
Punjab, India cricketers
North Zone cricketers